Natel Kenar-e Olya Rural District is a rural district (dehestan) in the Central District of Nur County, Mazandaran Province, Iran. At the 2006 census, its population was 10,809, in 2,591 families. The rural district has 21 villages.

References 

Rural Districts of Mazandaran Province
Nur County